Karmayodha is a 2012 Indian Malayalam-language action thriller film co-produced, written and directed by Major Ravi. It features Mohanlal, Mukesh, Murali Sharma, Sai Kumar, Mukesh, Bineesh Kodiyeri, Rajeev Pillai, Asha Sarath, Aishwarya Devan. The soundtrack was composed by M. G. Sreekumar; the background score was provided by Jeffrey Jonathan. The film deals about the illegal activities happening against women. The film received mixed reviews, and was just an average at the box office.

Plot
Madhavan Menon (Maddy) is a ruthless and daring investigating officer working with the Mumbai Police. He is an encounter specialist who makes decisions on the spot, without always waiting for orders from the top. His latest assignment is to investigate the missing of a teenage school girl from Mumbai. He reaches Kerala on being tipped off that the girl could be taken to Kerala. In the meantime, another girl gets kidnapped in Kerala, presumably by the same people or people linked to them. There is also information that some other girls too have been kidnapped. Following the leads, Maddy comes to the conclusion that all the girls have been abducted by a Kerala-based sex trafficking racket led by a psychotic criminal named Khais Khanna. Maddy embarks on a mission to eliminate the racket and save the girls, including his daughter, who gets kidnapped, Diya.

Cast

 Mohanlal as DCP Madhava Menon IPS aka. "Mad Maddy", Mumbai Police officer
 Murali Sharma as Khais Khanna, The Main Antagonist 
 Mukesh as CI Krishnaraj, Kerala Police
 Rajeev Pillai as ACP K.Tony IPS, Mumbai Police officer
 Asha Sarath as Arathi, Maddy's wife
 Sai Kumar as ACP Eepan Devassy IPS, Kerala Police Officer
 Pradeep Chandran as Arathi's Bose
 Bineesh Kodiyeri as Manu
 Shaalin as Renuka
 Aishwarya Devan as Saleena
 Sona Heiden as Selena 
 Malavika Nair as Diya
 Kannan Pattambi as Thenkasi Selvam (Dubbed by Major Ravi)
 Riyaz Khan as Sathan Sunny
 Vishnu Hariharan
 Sarayu
 Sudheer Karamana as Anoop
 Anil Murali as Salim
 Santosh Sleeba as a police officer
 Janardhanan as Narayana Menon
 Sukumari as Maddy's mother
 Gayathri Varsha as Krisharaj's Wife
 Jayakrishnan as District Collector Muhammad Riyaz IAS
 Bindu Ramakrishnan as Manu's mother
 Lakshmi Menon as Divya
 Sasi Kalinga as Chachaji
 Dr Rony David as City Police Commissioner, Mumbai Police (Voice Dubbed By Vijay Babu)

Production
The pooja ceremony of the film was held on 7 July 2012 at the BTH Sarovaram Hotel in Cochin, India. The film was shot on locations in Mumbai, Cochin, Munnar and Nagercoil. Filming began in August 2012.

Notably, Karmayodha is not set in the military backdrop that had characterised all other Mohanlal–Major Ravi films, such as Keerthi Chakra, Kurukshetra and Kandahar. "Mohanlal's characterisation is similar to Denzel Washington's in the action film Man On Fire, which is about a single man on a mission who doesn't play by the rules to reach there," says Ravi.

Marketing
The films' teaser featured the song "American VI: Ain't No Grave" by American musician Johnny Cash. It was the first time that an English track was being used in a Malayalam film. The makers also gave credit to Cash's song claiming that "It has been used for teaser purposes only". The teaser went viral, and received praise for incorporating the song, which perfectly sets the action-thriller tone of the film. "The idea of using the song came during the editing stage, and I thought it truly complemented the Mexican-style footage that was used for the teaser. Though the song is a free template that's been made available by its producers to be used by anyone, we have also given the due credit.", says Ravi. Cash often performed wearing dark clothing, earning him the nickname 'The Man in Black.' Mohanlal's character is also seen wearing a black attire in the teaser and the stills.

The first-look poster was released in September 2012; the film's first teaser was released on 3 October 2012, and a theatrical trailer was released on 25 November 2012.

Soundtrack

The soundtrack was composed by M. G. Sreekumar, with lyrics by Dr. Madhu Vasudevan. The album was launched on 25 November 2012 at IMA Hall in Kochi. The event was attended by Mohanlal, Joshiy, Major Ravi, Mukesh, Rajeev Pillai, MG Sreekumar, Pradeep Nair, Pranav Mohanlal, Renji Panicker, Jeffrey Jonathan and other personalities from the film industry, along with the technical crew and cast of the film. The background score for the film was provided by Jeffrey Jonathan. The film notably features Murukan Kattakada's famous poem "Kannada", which has been rendered by the poet himself.

Release
The distribution rights for Karmayodha in Kerala were bought by Red Rose Release. The film's premiere show was held on 20 December 2012 in Dubai, United Arab Emirates. The worldwide release took place on 21 December 2012. Karmayodha was released in Europe and the UAE on 27 December 2012.

Critical reception
The film opened to mixed reviews. Sify.com said: "A rather flimsy plot, some bad performances, silly lines and villains who are unintentionally comical make you cringe in the seats. The plot moves ahead without a definite aim or direction with some weak links that barely look convincing."

Rediff.com rated the movie 2 out of 5, saying: "Karmayodha is not worth watching".

Indiaglitz gave the film an average rating of 5.9/10, saying that "Karmayodha may satisfy the die-hard Mohanlal fans."

References

External links
 

Indian action thriller films
Films shot in Kochi
Films shot in Mumbai
Films shot in Munnar
Fictional portrayals of the Maharashtra Police
Films directed by Major Ravi
2010s Malayalam-language films